Professor Xiaolan Fu (傅晓岚) is a British-based Chinese economist, and Fellow of the Academy of Social Sciences. She is the Founding Director of the Technology and Management Centre for Development (TMCD). She is a Professor of Technology and International Development and Fellow of Green Templeton College at the University of Oxford.

Life
Xiaolan Fu was born in China on August 17, 1967 and she came to post graduate study at Lancaster University with her family. She completed her master's degree in a year and attained her economics doctorate in 2003. She wrote her thesis on the economics of her home country under the supervision of Vudayagi Balasubramanyam.

She was appointed by the Secretary-General of the United Nations to the Ten-Member High Level Advisory Group of the UN Technology Facilitation Mechanism and to the Governing Council of the UN's Technology Bank for Least Developed Countries. She is also a member of the UN SDSN Leadership Council led by Jeffrey Sachs.

Appointments
Professor Fu has been appointed as member of the scientific board of Globelics (Global Network for Economics of Learning, Innovation, and Competence Building Systems), member of the high-level group of the International Science Council, and has been a consultant for UNDESA, UNCTAD, UNIDO, the World Bank, OECD, European Commission, ILO, the Commonwealth Secretariat, UKTI, and the Chinese government. She serves on the Advisory Expert Group of the OECD Global Investment Forum and the DFID/ESRC Economic Growth Directorate (DEGP), and is president of the Chinese Economic Association (Europe) and CEA (UK) in 2010–2011. She has served on the Management Committee of the Oxford University China Centre since 2015. She is also a Senior Research Associate at the University of Cambridge and University of Tsinghua, and a Visiting Professor at Fudan University. As a China expert, she has participated in various interviews and panel discussions at mainstream media including BBC, Sky News, CCTV, CGTN, People's Daily, and China Daily. In 2014, she was invited to address the UN General Assembly on ‘Science, technology and innovation in developing countries’.

Professor Fu has been selected as one of ten winners in the Science and Innovation Management category of the Falling Walls Science Breakthroughs of the year 2021.

Her research interests include innovation, technology, and industrialization; trade, foreign direct investment and economic development; emerging Asian economies; innovation and productivity in UK/USA. In 2016, Professor Fu was a keynote speaker at the first Huawei European Academic Salon, where she shared her research on international innovation as well as university-industry linkages. She has published extensively in leading international journals independently or in collaboration with others. Her recent books include Innovation under the Radar (forthcoming), China's Path to Innovation, China's Role in Global Economic Recovery and The Rise of Technological Power in the South. She is Editor-in-Chief of the Journal of Chinese Economic and Business Studies, and serves on the Editorial Boards of Industrial and Corporate Change, International Journal of Technology Management, and four other international journals.

Professor Fu received research grants from funding bodies including the European Commission, ESRC, EPSRC, British Academy, DFID, and the Cairncross Foundation. She has also received the European Commission EFMD Gate2Growth 2005 'European Best Paper' Award, Emerald Literati Network Awards for Excellence 2012 Outstanding Paper Award, European Association of Management (EURAM) annual conference Innovation Strategic Interest Group 2017 Best Paper Award, and the best paper award in the  ‘Corporate and start-up collaboration’ track at the 2021 R&D Management Annual Conference.

Professor Fu came to Oxford from Cambridge University in 2006, where she was a senior research fellow. Before coming to the UK to begin her career in academia, she had five years’ work experience in the business sector in China. She is a Fellow of Green Templeton College, Oxford and is associated with Queen Elizabeth House. She testified on "the impact of China's Five-year Plans on Strategic Industries" at the US-China Economic and Security Review Commission Congressional Hearing.

Media presence
Professor Fu had a large presence in the media in regards to the COVID-19 pandemic and its effects on the world's economic climate both in the present and future. She began these interactions shortly after the pandemic began and continued until her last interview published under her University of Oxford staff biography. For such an interview, Professor Fu focused mainly on the short and long-term effects of the COVID-19 pandemic on international trade and various innovations that will take place as a cause of this.

Selected publications
Books and monographs

 Fu, Xiaolan (with J Chen & B McKern) (Eds)(2021). The Oxford Handbook of China Innovation, Oxford University Press.
 Fu, Xiaolan (2020) Innovation Under the Radar: The Nature and Sources of Innovation in Africa, Cambridge University Press.
 Fu, Xiaolan (2015) China's Path to Innovation, Cambridge University Press. (Monograph)
 Fu, Xiaolan (ed) (2011) China's Role in Global Economic Recovery, Routledge. Translated into Chinese and published by Yilin Press in 2012.
 Fu, Xiaolan (with Luc Soete) (eds) (2010) The Rise of Technological Power in the South, Basingstoke: Palgrave Macmillan.
 Fu, Xiaolan (with A Cosh, A Hughes, R De Hoyos, A Eisingerich) (2006) Experiences of UK Mid-corporate Companies in Emerging Asian Economies, UK Trade & Investment
 Fu, Xiaolan (2004) Exports, Foreign Direct Investment and Economic Development in China, London and New York: Palgrave Macmillan. (Monograph)

Articles

 Fu, X., Fu, M. Q., Ghauri, P. and Hou J. (2022) International collaboration and innovation: from a leading Chinese multinational enterprise. Journal of World Business, 57 (4). https://doi.org/10.1016/j.jwb.2022.101329 
 Fu, X., Ghauri, P., Ogbonna, N. and Xing, X. (2022) Platform technology and entrepreneurship in the base of the pyramid. Technovation. https://doi.org/10.1016/j.technovation.2021.102451 
 Ghauri, P, Fu, X. and Minayora, A. (2022) Digital technology-based entrepreneurial pursuit of the marginalised communities. Journal of International Management. https://doi.org/10.1016/j.intman.2022.100948 
 Li, J., Van Assche, A. Fu, X., Li, Lee and G. Qian (2022) The Belt and Road Initiative and international business policy: A kaleidoscopic perspective. Journal of International Business Policy. https://doi.org/10.1057/s42214-022-00136-x 
 Fu, X., Buckley, P., Sanchez-Ancochea, D. and Hasan, I. (2021) The World has a Unique Opportunity, Journal of International Business Policy.  https://link.springer.com/article/10.1057/s42214-021-00124-7 
 Fu, X., Li, Y., Li, J. and H. Chesbrough (2021) When do latecomer firms undertake international open innovation: Evidence from China. Global Strategy Journal. 12 (1), 31-56.  https://doi.org/10.1002/gsj.1401 
 Chen, J., Yin, X., Fu, X. and B. McKern (2021) Beyond catch-up: could China become the global innovation powerhouse? China’s innovation progress and challenges from a holistic innovation perspective. Industry and Corporate Change, 30(4), 1037-1064. https://doi.org/10.1093/icc/dtab032 
 Lin, Y., Fu, M.X., and Fu, X. (2021) Varieties in state capitalism and corporate innovation: Evidence from an emerging economy, Journal of Corporate Finance, 67, 101919. https://doi.org/10.1016/j.jcorpfin.2021.101919 
 Fu, X., Emes, D., and Hou, J. (2021) Multinational enterprises and structural change in developing countries: A survey of literature. International Business Review. 30 (2), 101801. https://doi.org/10.1016/j.ibusrev.2021.101801 
 Fu, M.X., Bao. Q., Xie, H., and Fu, X. (2021) Diffusion of industrial robots and inclusive growth: labour market evidence from cross-country data. Journal of Business Research, 122, 670-684. https://doi.org/10.1016/j.jbusres.2020.05.051. 
 Fu, X., Avenyo E. and Ghauri, P. (2021) Digital platform and development: A survey of literature, Innovation and Development, 11(2-3), 303-321. https://doi.org/10.1080/2157930X.2021.1975361
 Fu, X., Zhang, J. and Wang, L. (2020) The impact of Covid-19 and post-pandemic recovery: China and the world economy, Journal of Chinese Economic and Business Studies, 18 (4), 311-319. https://doi.org/10.1080/14765284.2020.1855939 
 Fu, X., Fu, M. X., Remero, C. and Pan, J. (2020) Exploring new opportunities through collaboration within and beyond sectoral systems of innovation: Evidence from China. Industry and Corporate Change, 30 (1), 233–249. https://doi.org/10.1093/icc/dtaa058 
 Lema, R., Fu, X., & Rabellotti, R. (2020) Green windows of opportunity: latecomer development in the age of transformation toward sustainability, Industry and Corporate Change, 29 (5), 1193–1209. https://doi.org/10.1093/icc/dtaa044  (published in 2021)
 Fu, X. and Ghauri, P. (2020), Trade in Intangibles and the Global Trade Imbalance. The World Economy.
 Fu, X.M., Bao, Q., Xie, H. and Fu, X. (2020) Diffusion of industrial robotics and inclusive growth: Labour market evidence from cross country data. Journal of Business Research.
 Corsi, S., Fu, X. and Kulzer-Sacilotto, C. (2020) Boundary spanning roles in cross-border university-industry collaboration: the case of Chinese multinational corporations. R&D management.
 Fu, X. (2020) Digital transformation of global value chains and sustainable post-pandemic recovery. Transnational Corporation, 27(2).
 Fu, X., Buckley, P.J. and Fu, X.M., (2020) The Growth Impact of Chinese Direct Investment on Host Developing Countries. International Business Review, 29(2), p. 101658.
 Fu, X., J Hou, M. Sanfilippo,(2016) ‘Highly skilled returnees and the internationalization of EMNEs: Firm level evidence from China’, International Business Review.
 Fu, Xiaolan (with Pietrobelli, and Soete) (2011), ‘The role of foreign technology and indigenous innovation in emerging economies: technological change and catch-up’, World Development, v39, no 7, 1203-1212.
 Fu, Xiaolan (and Gong) (2011), ‘Indigenous and foreign innovation efforts and drivers of technological upgrading’, World Development, v39, no 7, 1213-1225.
 Fu, Xiaoland (and Zhu) (2013) ‘Drivers of export upgrading’, World Development, v51, 221-233, 
 Fu, Xiaolan (2012) ‘Managerial knowledge spillovers from FDI through the diffusion of management practices’, Journal of Management Studies, v49, no 5, 970-999.
 Fu, Xiaolan (2012) ‘How does openness affect the importance of incentives for innovation?’ Research Policy, 41 (3), 512-523.
 Fu, Xiaolan (and Yang) (2009), ‘Exploring the cross-country gap in patenting: A Stochastic Frontier Approach’, Research Policy, vol38, no 7. 1203-1213.
 Fu, Xiaolan (with Zanello Mohnen and Ventresca) (2015), ‘Innovation in low income countries: a literature review’, Journal of Economic Survey. 
 Fu, Xiaolan (and Akter, S.) (2016) ‘The Impact of Mobile Phone Technology on Agricultural Extension Services Delivery: Evidence from India’, Journal of Development Studies.
 Fu, Xiaolan (and Li) (2016), ‘Collaboration with foreign universities for innovation: evidence from Chinese manufacturing firms’, International Journal of Technology Management, Vol. 70, Nos. 2/3,193-217.
 Fu, Xiaolan (2011) ‘Processing-trade, FDI and Exports of Indigenous Firms: Firm-level Evidence from High-technology Industries in China’, Oxford Bulletin of Economics and Statistics, v73, no 5. 792-817.
 Fu, Xiaolan (with Xiong, Li and Chesbrough) (2014), ‘Open Innovation as a Response to Constraints and Risks: Evidence from China’, Asian Economic Papers, 13 (3).
 Fu, Xiaolan (with Kaplinsky and Zhang) (2012), ‘The Impact of China on Low and Middle Income Countries’ Export Prices in Industrial-Country Markets’ World Development, v40 (8), 1483-96 (lead paper).
 Fu, Xiaolan (and Balasubramanyam) (2005), ‘Exports, Foreign Direct Investment and Employment: the Case of China’, World Economy, vol.28, no. 4, 607-625.
 Fu, Xiaolan (2004) ‘Limited Linkages from Growth Engines and Regional Disparities in China’, Journal of Comparative Economics, vol 32, no. 1, 148-164.
 Fu, Xiaolan (and Balasubramanyam) (2003), ‘Township and Village Enterprises in China’, Journal of Development Studies, Vol. 39, No. 4, 27-46.

Current research
 MNEmerge project: MNEs and global development
 Valuation of early-stage technology 
 Understanding innovation in low-income country 
 Diffusion of innovation in low-incomes country
 The Role of Internationalisation on Technological Capability-Upgrading in Developing Countries
The Inclusive Digital Model project

References

External links
 Xiaolan Fu home page

Living people
Chinese expatriates in the United Kingdom
Alumni of Lancaster University
Chinese economists
Chinese women academics
Academics of the University of Cambridge
Fellows of Green Templeton College, Oxford
Academic staff of Tsinghua University
Academic staff of Fudan University
Academic journal editors
1967 births